Heath Robertson Murray (born April 19, 1973) is an American former Major League Baseball player.  A pitcher, Murray played for the San Diego Padres (1997 and 1999), Detroit Tigers (2001), and Cleveland Indians (2002).

He played college baseball for Michigan, and in 1993 he played collegiate summer baseball with the Harwich Mariners of the Cape Cod Baseball League.

He is a pitching coach for his high school alma mater, Troy High School.

He currently runs his own insurance agency in Troy, OH.

References

External links

1973 births
Living people
San Diego Padres players
Detroit Tigers players
Cleveland Indians players
Buffalo Bisons (minor league) players
Michigan Wolverines baseball players
Harwich Mariners players
Baseball players from Ohio
People from Troy, Ohio
Albuquerque Dukes players
Las Vegas Stars (baseball) players
Memphis Chicks players
Rancho Cucamonga Quakes players
Spokane Indians players
Toledo Mud Hens players